Abu al-As al-Hakam ibn Hisham ibn Abd al-Rahman was Umayyad Emir of Cordoba from 796 until 822 in Al-Andalus (Moorish Iberia).

Biography
Al-Hakam was the second son of his father, his older brother having died at an early age. When he came to power, he was challenged by his uncles Sulayman and Abdallah, sons of his grandfather Abd ar-Rahman I. Abdallah took his two sons Ubayd Allah and Abd al-Malik to the court of Charlemagne in Aix-la-Chapelle to negotiate for aid. In the meantime Sulayman attacked Cordoba, but was defeated and driven back to Mérida where he was captured and executed. Abdallah was pardoned, but was forced to stay in Valencia.

Al-Hakam spent much of his reign suppressing rebellions in Toledo, Saragossa and Mérida. The uprisings twice reached Cordoba. An attempt was made to dethrone Al-Hakam and replace him with his cousin, Mohammed ibn al-Kasim, but the plot was discovered. On 16 November 806, 72 nobles and their attendants (accounts talk of 5,000) were massacred at a banquet, crucified and displayed along the banks of the river Guadalquivir. Such displays of cruelty were not unusual during this period, with the heads of rebel leaders or Christian foes killed in expeditions to the north being put on show at the gates of Cordoba.

Following the rebellion in Cordoba, Al-Hakam established a personal bodyguard, the Al-Haras, led by the Visigothic leader of the Christians in Cordoba, the Comes (Count) Rabi, son of Theodulf, who also served as the Emir's tax collector. Rabi was later removed and executed by crucifixion for corruption.
 
Some 300 notables were captured and crucified, while the rest of the inhabitants were exiled. Some moved to Alexandria in Egypt, some to Fez and Crete, where they formed an emirate. Others joined the Levantine pirates.

Death
Al-Hakam I died in 822 after having ruled for 26 years.

Family
Al-Hakam was the son of Hisham I, Emir of Cordoba and a concubine named Zokhrouf.

Al Hakam fathered five children with his wife Halawah:
 Abd ar-Rahman II, Umayyad Emir of Córdoba 822–852
 al-Mughira
 Said
 Umayya
 al-Walid bin al-Hakam. He led an army to attack Galicia in 838.

Al-Hakam had a concubine named Ajab. She established a foundation for lepers in the suburbs of Cordoba. The leper colony was funded by the proceeds of the Munyat 'Ajab, an estate built for or named after Ajab.
Ajab was the mother of:
 Abu Abd Al-Malik Marwan

Another concubine was named Mut'a. She established a cemetery which was still in existence in the 10th century.

References

External links
Arabic biography

Emirs of Córdoba
9th-century rulers in Europe
771 births
822 deaths

Year of birth unknown
8th-century Arabs
9th-century Arabs